Reina Hispanoamericana 2019 was the 29th edition of the Reina Hispanoamericana pageant. It was held on February 8, 2020, in Santa Cruz de la Sierra, Bolivia. Nariman Battikha of Venezuela crowned Regina Peredo of México as her successor at the end of the event.

Results

Placements

 § voted via the Internet

Order of Announcements
Top 11

Hispanic Beauty Gala

Contestants

Crossovers
These are the contestants who previously competed or will be competing at other international beauty pageants:
 Miss Universe
2017:  Casandra Cherry
2019:  Ketlin Lottermann
 Miss World
 2015:  Stefanía Alemán 
2017:  Gabrielle Vilela (Top°40)
 Miss International
2018:  Stefania Aleman 
2018:  Cassandra Cherry
2022:  Gabriela Irías (TBA)
 Miss Grand International
2017:  Diana Sofía Silva
2018:  Gabrielle Vilela (Top°21)
 Miss Eco International
2017:  Diana Sofía Silva
 Miss Planet International
2017:  Marianella Chaves (Top°10)
 Miss World Latin 
2018:  Stefani Zeceña
 World Top Model
2018:  Lincy Colman (4th Runner-Up)
2018:  Tiffany de Freitas Brás

Notes

References

Reina Hispanoamericana
2019 beauty pageants
Events in Santa Cruz de la Sierra